The 2014 Reinert Open was a professional tennis tournament played on outdoor clay courts. It was the seventh edition of the tournament which was part of the 2014 ITF Women's Circuit, offering a total of $50,000 in prize money. It took place in Versmold, Germany, on 30 June–6 July 2014.

Singles main draw entrants

Seeds 

 1 Rankings as of 23 June 2014

Other entrants 
The following players received wildcards into the singles main draw:
  Karin Knapp
  Antonia Lottner 
  Urszula Radwanska
  Julia Wachaczyk

The following players received entry from the qualifying draw:
  Verónica Cepede Royg
  Lenka Juríková
  Oleksandra Korashvili
  Zuzana Luknárová

Champions

Singles 

  Kateryna Kozlova def.  Richèl Hogenkamp 6–4, 6–7(3–7), 6–1

Doubles 

  Gabriela Dabrowski /  Mariana Duque def.  Verónica Cepede Royg /  Stephanie Vogt 6–4, 6–2

External links 
 2014 Reinert Open at ITFtennis.com
  

Versmold
Reinert Open
2014 in German tennis
2014 in German women's sport